Belgium competed at the 2022 Winter Olympics in Beijing, China, from 4 to 20 February 2022.

The Belgian team consisted of 19 athletes (11 men and 8 women) competing in eight sports.

Loena Hendrickx and Armand Marchant were the country's flagbearers during the opening ceremony. Short track speed skater Hanne Desmet was the flagbearer during the closing ceremony.

Medalists

The following Belgium competitors won medals at the games. In the discipline sections below, the medalists' names are bolded. On 19 February, Bart Swings, won Belgium's first Winter Olympic Gold medal since the 1948 Winter Olympics.

Competitors
The following is a list of the number of competitors who participated at the Games per sport/discipline.

Alpine skiing

Belgium qualified three male, and one female, alpine skiers.

Biathlon 

Belgium qualified four male and 1 female biathletes and a men's relay team.

Bobsleigh 

Belgium qualified one team for the women's bobsleigh competition.

* – Denotes the driver of the sled

Cross-country skiing

By meeting the basic qualification standards Belgium qualified one male cross-country skier.

Due to high winds and adverse weather conditions, the men's 50 km freestyle competition on 19 February was shortened to 30 km. 

Distance

Sprint

Figure skating

In the 2021 World Figure Skating Championships in Stockholm, Sweden, Belgium secured one quota in the ladies singles competition.

Individual

Short track speed skating

Belgium has qualified two short track speed skaters (one of each gender).

Key: FA = Qualified to medal round; FB = Qualified to consolation round; PEN = Penalty; Q = Qualified to next round based on position in heat; q = Qualified to next round based on time in field

Skeleton 

Belgium qualified a single female athlete for the skeleton event.

Snowboarding 

Belgium qualified a single female athlete for the snowboarding event.

Freestyle

Speed skating 

Mass start

See also
Belgium at the 2022 Winter Paralympics

References

Nations at the 2022 Winter Olympics
2022
Winter Olympics